Congress is a formal meeting of the representatives of different nations, constituent states, independent organizations (such as trade unions and political parties), or groups.

Congress may also refer to:

National legislatures
 Congress of Paraguay
 Congress of the Confederation, the national legislature of the United States 1781–1789
 Congress of the Dominican Republic
 Congress of the French Parliament, the name of a joint sitting of the national legislature of France
 Congress of the Federated States of Micronesia
 Congress of the Philippines
 Congress of the Republic of Guatemala
 Congress of the Republic of Peru
 Congress of the Portuguese Republic, 1910-1926
 Congress of the Republic of Texas, 1836–1848
 Congress of the Union, Mexico
 United States Congress, the national legislature of the United States since 1789
United States House of Representatives, often incorrectly called "congress"
Congress of the Republic of Venezuela

Arts, entertainment, and media
 Congress (solitaire), a card game
 "Congress", an instrumental track on Casualties of Retail, a 2005 album by Enter the Haggis
 The Congress (1988 film), a 1988 documentary film directed by Ken Burns
 The Congress (2013 film), a 2013 action/animation film
 "The Congress" (short story), a 1971 Argentinian essay by Jorge Luis Borges

Places
 Congress, Arizona, a census-designated place in Yavapai County
 Congress, Ohio, a village in Wayne County
 Congress, Saskatchewan, a hamlet in Canada
 Congress Avenue (Florida), a road in Palm Beach County
 Congress Avenue Historic District, an area of downtown Austin, Texas, along Congress Avenue

Political groups
 Indian National Congress, a political party in India
 Congress (A), a political party mainly active in Kerala, India until 1982
 Congress (Dolo), a 2003 political group in Arunachal Pradesh, India
 Congress (Secular), a political party in Kerala, India

Other uses
 Richard Congress, an Ohio politician
 USS Congress, various ships of the U.S. Navy

See also 
 
 
 National Congress (disambiguation)
 Congress of Deputies (disambiguation)
 Congress of People's Deputies (disambiguation)
 Congress Township (disambiguation)